This is a list of all 74 episodes of Akazukin Chacha, an anime television series based on a manga series of the same title by Min Ayahana.  The television series began airing in Japan on 7 January 1994 at 6:00 pm on the TV Tokyo Network in Japan. The series ran for one and a half years, with episode 74 airing on 30 June 1995.

This list also contains the three 30-minute OVAs which were released in 1995 and 1996 following the end of the television series.

Summary of series
Each television episode is about 25 minutes long.

Television series (1994-1995)

Sources:

OVA series (1995-1996)

Sources:

References

Akazukin Chacha